Sepé Tiaraju Airport  is the airport serving Santo Ângelo, Brazil. It is named after Sepé Tiaraju (?-1756), a Guaraní warrior who led the Guaraní forces in the Guaraní War in Misiones Orientales.

It is managed by contract by Infraero.

History
On October 10, 2022 the State of Rio Grande do Sul signed a contract of operation with Infraero. Previously the airport was operated by DAP.

Airlines and destinations

Access

See also

 List of airports in Brazil

References

External links
 
 
 

Airports in Rio Grande do Sul
Santo Ângelo